The 1860 United States presidential election in South Carolina took place on November 6, 1860, as part of this 1860 United States presidential election. The state legislature chose 8 representatives, or electors to the Electoral College, who voted for president and vice president.  By 1860 only one state, South Carolina, used this procedure in a presidential election. 

South Carolina cast 8 electoral votes for the Southern Democratic candidate John C. Breckinridge. These electors were chosen by the South Carolina General Assembly, the state legislature, rather than by popular vote. However, Republican Party candidate Abraham Lincoln would win the election nationally and would cause a major upset in the Southern States. South Carolina would be the first state to secede from the Union, on December 20, 1860, and would join the newly formed Confederate States of America in the February of the following year. South Carolina would not vote in another presidential election until 1868.

Results

References

South Carolina
1860
1860 South Carolina elections